The Only Constant is an album by American jazz fusion group Snarky Puppy that was released in 2006.

Track listing

Personnel
Source: 
 Michael League – bass guitar, double bass
 Jay Jennings – trumpet, flugelhorn
 Sara Jacovino – trombone
 Brian Donohoe – soprano saxophone, alto saxophone
 Clay Pritchard – tenor saxophone
 Bob Lanzetti – electric guitar
 Chris McQueen – electric guitar, acoustic guitar
 Bill Laurance – piano, electric piano
 Ross Pederson – drums
 Nate Werth – percussion

References

2006 albums
Snarky Puppy albums